The Fréjus Road Tunnel is a tunnel that connects France and Italy. It runs under Col du Fréjus in the Cottian Alps between Modane in France and Bardonecchia in Italy. It is one of the major trans-Alpine transport routes between France and Italy being used for 80% of the commercial road traffic.

It cost 2 billion francs (equivalent to €700 million at 2005 prices). It is the thirteenth longest road tunnel in the world.

The French section is managed by the French company SFTRF, and the Italian section by the Italian company SITAF. (The French politician Pierre Dumas was chairman of SFTRF from 1962 to 1989). The tunnel can be reached from the Italian side by the A32 Torino-Bardonecchia motorway, or by SS335 from Oulx, which joins SS24 (“del Monginevro”), and reaches Bardonecchia after . From the French side, it can be reached by the A43 (“l’Autoroute de la Maurienne”) from Lyon and Chambéry. A toll is charged to all traffic. Over 20 million vehicles passed through the tunnel during the first 20 years.

Safety
Following a major fire in the Mont Blanc tunnel in 1999, measures were taken at the start of 2000 to improve safety in the tunnel. The tunnel was equipped with the latest smoke and flame detectors, and a system of videocameras in the tunnel to detect the speed of traffic, as well as fire and smoke. Temperature sensors were installed at short distances throughout the tunnel, monitored from a central control post. Fire hydrants were installed every 130 m, fed from large water tanks. There are 11 safety points along the tunnel, equipped with telephones and loud speakers connected to the control room, with a separate ventilation duct to supply fresh air. These are separated from the main tunnel by two fire doors; the outer door closes automatically when the temperature in the tunnel reaches a certain level. Finally there is a ‘thermal gate’ system at each entrance to identify any overheating vehicles.

Despite these measures, on 4 June 2005, a fire caused the death of two Slovak lorry drivers, and the closure of the tunnel to traffic for several weeks. It reopened to cars on 4 August 2005, and later to commercial vehicles.  The tunnel was also briefly closed due to non-fatal fires on 9 January 2007, 29 November 2010, and 10 April 2014.

Work began in 2009, following EU regulations put in place after the Mont Blanc Tunnel fire. The breakthrough occurred on 17 November 2014. The new bore is due to open to traffic in the autumn of 2023. As there will still be a single lane for each direction (the other lane being an emergency lane), the capacity of the tunnel will remain unchanged. Both bores will be connected by a series of passages, five of which can be used by emergency vehicles.

Fréjus Underground Laboratory

Near the midpoint is the Laboratoire Souterrain de Modane (also referred to as the Fréjus Underground Laboratory).  This site houses the Neutrino Ettore Majorana Observatory (NEMO experiment), an international collaboration of scientists searching for neutrinoless double beta decay. An observation of neutrinoless double beta decay would be evidence that neutrinos are Majorana particles and could be used to measure the neutrino mass.  Attempts are underway to build a larger laboratory, either in the same tunnel or in the even deeper Lyon Turin Ferroviaire 15 km to the east.

References

External links

Homepage
 

Tunnels in the Alps
Road tunnels in France
Road tunnels in Italy
Transport in Piedmont
Toll tunnels in Europe
France–Italy border crossings
Tunnels completed in 1980
International tunnels
1980 establishments in France
1980 establishments in Italy
Bardonecchia